Southey and Gotleigh Moors is an 81.3 hectare (200.1 acre) biological Site of Special Scientific Interest on the Blackdown Hills in Somerset, notified in 1988.

Southey and Gotleigh Moors is a mosaic of valley mire, acid-marsh grassland and alder-birch carr. The diversity of the site is enhanced by the presence of the Bolham River and small areas of standing water which increase the amphibian and invertebrate interest. The nationally scarce leaf beetle (Phyllobrotica quadrimaculata) has been found here.

References

External links 

Sites of Special Scientific Interest in Somerset
Sites of Special Scientific Interest notified in 1988